Clivia is a 1933 operetta by Nico Dostal to a libretto by Charles Amberg. The premiere was 23 December 1933 at the Berlin Theater am Nollendorfplatz. The plot concerns the adventures of a film star, Clivia Gray, in the South American republic of Boliguay and her romance with the Boliguayan president. The premiere featured Lillie Claus, later Dostal's wife, and Walter Jankuhn in the tenor role of the president.

Recording
Anneliese Rothenberger, Fritz Schröder-Jahn, Walter Giller, Hans Herbert Fiedler, Rupert Glawitsch, NWDR SO Hamburg, Wilhelm Stephan 1951

References

1933 operas
Operas by Nico Dostal
Operas
German-language operas